Shelley Segal (born 4 April 1987) is an Australian singer and songwriter. She is most known for music with secular themes, including her 2011 album, An Atheist Album. She has toured Australia, the United Kingdom, Hong Kong, China, and the United States and has played at many atheist/secular events including the Reason Rally, the American Humanist Association conference, California Free Thought Day, the Global Atheist Convention, ReAsonCon, Gateway to Reason, and Reasonfest. Her first single, "Saved", is currently used as the opening theme by the webcast and cable access television show The Atheist Experience.

Biography

Early life
Segal was born in Melbourne, Australia. She was raised in a traditional Jewish household. Her father, Danny Segal, is the president of the East Melbourne Synagogue (as of August 2017) and plays violin in a klezmer wedding band. At the age of 11, Shelley Segal began singing in her father's band and writing her own songs. She came to call herself an atheist around the age of 18. With a different perspective, Segal began to see religion more negatively than when a theist, taking issue with things such as gender segregation in Orthodox Jewish synagogues. Segal also identifies as a humanist.

Career

Segal released her first recording, Shelley Segal EP, in 2009. It is composed of songs Segal wrote at ages 1521.

In 2011, Segal released her album An Atheist Album. She says she created it "firstly as an expression of my honest response to [the debate between religious and secular world-views]." It contains the following songs:
"Apocalyptic Love Song" (on human insignificance and finding meaning in life, dedicated to Christopher Hitchens)
"Afterlife" (on the impacts of believing in an afterlife)
"House With No Walls" (on people creating unique, personal beliefs when they don't fully agree with religious doctrine and on avoiding questioning one's beliefs)
"Gratitude" (on appreciating and being grateful for life without religious belief)
"Saved" (on the concept of eternal torment and those who utilize it as an evangelical tool) This was Segal's first single; it is currently used as the opening theme for the webcast and cable access television show, The Atheist Experience.
"I Don't Believe In Fairies" (on the lack of evidence for the supernatural)
"Eve" (on misogyny in the Bible)

Segal co-wrote and provided vocals for the Carl Cox dance song Chemistry.

In 2013, Segal toured with guitarist Adam Levy and released the album Little March in collaboration with him. The songs of the album deal with love and relationships.

Segal released her album An Easy Escape in 2014. The reggae-inspired song Morocco from this album became controversial in Morocco. A song based on her experiences travelling in Morocco, many in Morocco criticized references to drug use in Morocco. The Moroccan news site Afriquinfos claimed she "denounced the kingdom [of Morocco]." About the song, Segal said to Fairfax Media: "It's just to contrast that situation as a tourist and having fun and getting to escape my troubles, contrasted with some troubles local people are facing and questioning what is my place here ... and what troubles do I actually have."

In 2015, Segal released her EP Strange Feeling. The body-positive song Sidelined from this album was a finalist in the 2016 Unsigned Only competition.

In 2016, Segal signed with Los Angeles publishing house 411 Music Group and moved to Los Angeles.

Discography

Albums
Shelley Segal EP (2009)
An Atheist Album (2011), True Music
Little March (2013) with Adam Levy, True Music
An Easy Escape (2014), True Music
Strange Feeling EP (2015)
Forms EP (2018)
Holy EP (2019)

Singles
Saved (2011)
Chemistry (2011) with Carl Cox
Begin Again (2017)
Ghostly Afterimage (2021)
Pull You Down (2021)
Sing (2021)
Unloved (2022)

References

External links
 

Australian women singer-songwriters
Australian singer-songwriters
Musicians from Melbourne
Australian humanists
21st-century atheists
Australian atheism activists
Jewish atheists
Australian expatriates in the United States
Australian women guitarists
1987 births
Living people
21st-century Australian singers
21st-century Australian women singers